Nihell is a surname. Notable people with the surname include:

 Alanna Nihell (born 1985), Irish boxer
 Elizabeth Nihell (1723–1776), English midwife, obstetrics writer, and polemicist